Parker Pond is a pond in Wicomico County, Maryland formed by a widening of Beaverdam Creek.

References

Chesapeake Bay watershed
Bodies of water of Wicomico County, Maryland